L'Spaerow are an Indie/Experimental/Rock group based out of Chicago, Illinois.  The band is signed with Lucid Records of Deerfield, Illinois.  L'Spaerow released their self-titled album in 2003.

L'Spaerow Members
Christopher Broach - (vocals, guitars, keyboards, synthesizer) Broach is working on a solo record.
Adam Johnson - (piano, keyboards, synthesizer, bass instrument) Has a solo project called Notebook, plays with Chris Broach for his solo project, has filled in on bass and keyboards with Broach's The Firebird Band, and has released a remix he did for Bob Nanna's The City on Film.
Kenneth Boksa - (drums) Now plays in White Hot Knife, is working on some solo electro material, and occasionally joins Broach to record drums for Broach's solo project.

Discography

Studio albums
L'Spaerow (June 1, 2003) - Lucid Records

External links
 L'Spaerow's MySpace page
 L'Spaerow's website
 L'Spaerow at Lucid Records

American experimental musical groups
Indie rock musical groups from Illinois
Musical groups from Chicago